Vandre West Assembly constituency is one of the 288 Vidhan Sabha constituencies of Maharashtra state in western India, since 2008. Vandre, also known as Bandra, is a suburb of Mumbai. Before the 2008 delimitation of assembly seats, this seat's area was covered under Vandre Assembly constituency, represented by Ramdas Nayak among others.

Overview
Vandre West (constituency number 177) is one of the 26 Vidhan Sabha constituencies located in the Mumbai Suburban district. The number of electors in 2009 was 297,919 (male 155,345, female 142,574).

Vandre West is part of the Mumbai North Central Lok Sabha constituency along with five other Vidhan Sabha segments, namely Vile Parle, Chandivali, Kurla, Kalina and Vandre East in the Mumbai Suburban district.

Members of Legislative Assembly

Election results

Assembly Elections 2019

Assembly Elections 2014

Assembly Elections 2009

See also
 Bandra
 List of constituencies of Maharashtra Vidhan Sabha

References

Assembly constituencies of Mumbai
Politics of Mumbai Suburban district
Assembly constituencies of Maharashtra